Marko Malenica (born 8 February 1994) is a Croatian professional football goalkeeper playing for NK Osijek.

Club career
A product of the NK Osijek youth system, he has presented the Croatian youth national teams. He has been loaned out to many clubs, including NK Cibalia and HNK Segesta in Croatia, to Lech Poznań and their reserves in Poland and Diósgyőri VTK in Hungary.

References

External links

1994 births
Living people
People from Nova Gradiška
Association football goalkeepers
Croatian footballers
Croatia youth international footballers
Croatia under-21 international footballers
NK Osijek players
HNK Cibalia players
HNK Segesta players
Lech Poznań players
Lech Poznań II players
Diósgyőri VTK players
Croatian Football League players
First Football League (Croatia) players
II liga players
Nemzeti Bajnokság I players
Croatian expatriate footballers
Expatriate footballers in Poland
Croatian expatriate sportspeople in Poland
Expatriate footballers in Hungary
Croatian expatriate sportspeople in Hungary